Sascha Rabe (born 31 October 1985) is a German former competitive ice dancer. With partner Rina Thieleke, he finished in twelfth place at the 2005 World Junior Championships and won the silver medal at the 2005–2006 ISU Junior Grand Prix event in Japan. With later partner Tanja Kolbe, he is the 2009 German national bronze medalist.

Programs

With Kolbe

With Thieleke

Results 
JGP = ISU Junior Grand Prix

With Kolbe

With Thieleke

References

External links

 
 
 Tanja Kolbe / Sascha Rabe Tracings.net 
 Rina Thieleke / Sascha Rabe Tracings.net

German male ice dancers
1985 births
Figure skaters from Berlin
Living people
21st-century German politicians
20th-century German people